Furnace Run is a  long 2nd order tributary to the Youghiogheny River in Fayette County, Pennsylvania.

Course
Furance Run rises in Buena Vista, Pennsylvania, and then flows northeast to join the Youghiogheny River about 1 mile west of Dawson.

Watershed
Furnace Run drains  of area, receives about 43.0 in/year of precipitation, has a wetness index of 348.92, and is about 67% forested.

Natural History
Furnace Run is the location of Furnace Run Confluence BDA, which contains a scour area and a mature riverine forest as well as a rare plant species.

References

 
Tributaries of the Ohio River
Rivers of Pennsylvania
Rivers of Fayette County, Pennsylvania
Allegheny Plateau